Colin Cameron (September 28, 1896 – July 28, 1968) was a Canadian politician who represented the electoral districts of Nanaimo from 1953 to 1958 and Nanaimo—Cowichan—The Islands from 1962 to 1968 in the House of Commons of Canada. He was a member of the Cooperative Commonwealth Federation in his first term of office, and of its successor, the New Democratic Party, in his second term.

Born in England, Cameron came to Canada in 1907 at the age of ten. He worked as a farmer and in a shipyard before entering politics.

He also represented the district of Comox in the Legislative Assembly of British Columbia from 1937 to 1945. During World War I, Cameron served overseas as an engineer with the 1st Canadian Pioneer Battalion in France and Belgium.

He served as the NDP's financial critic. Cameron died suddenly in office from a stroke at the age of 71.

He was the author of Forestry ... B.C.'s devastated industry (ca 1940) and Money and the war (ca 1943).

References 

1896 births
1968 deaths
Members of the House of Commons of Canada from British Columbia
Co-operative Commonwealth Federation MPs
New Democratic Party MPs
British Columbia Co-operative Commonwealth Federation MLAs
20th-century Canadian legislators
British emigrants to Canada